Tropic of Violence (French: Tropique de la violence) is a 2016 novel by Nathacha Appanah. First published by Éditions Gallimard in 2016, it was awarded the Prix du roman métis des lycéens in 2017.

References 

2016 French novels
Éditions Gallimard books
Mayotte in fiction
Novels about orphans
Books adapted into comics